The 2022 WISE Power 400 was the second stock car race of the 2022 NASCAR Cup Series and the 25th running of the event. The race was held on Sunday, in Fontana, California, at Auto Club Speedway, a  permanent D-shaped oval racetrack. The race took the scheduled 200 laps to complete. At race's end, Kyle Larson, driving for Hendrick Motorsports, would win a drama-filled race after a controversial block on teammate Chase Elliott within the closing laps of the race had put Elliott in the wall. Larson would defend the field on the final restart to win his 17th career NASCAR Cup Series race and his first of the season. To fill out the top 3, Austin Dillon of Richard Childress Racing and Erik Jones of Petty GMS Motorsports would finish second and third, respectively.

Report

Background

It is also used for open wheel racing events. The racetrack is located near the former locations of Ontario Motor Speedway and Riverside International Raceway. The track is owned and operated by International Speedway Corporation and is the only track owned by ISC to have naming rights sold. The speedway is served by the nearby Interstate 10 and Interstate 15 freeways as well as a Metrolink station located behind the backstretch.

Entry list
 (R) denotes rookie driver.
 (i) denotes driver who is ineligible for series driver points.

Practice

Practice results

Qualifying

Qualifying results

Race

Stage Results

Stage One
Laps: 65

Stage Two
Laps: 65

Final Stage Results

Stage Three
Laps: 70

Race statistics
 Lead changes: 32 among 9 different drivers
 Cautions/Laps: 12 for 59 laps
 Red flags: 0
 Time of race: 3 hours, 3 minutes and 7 seconds
 Average speed:

Media

Television
The race was the 21st race Fox Sports covered at the Auto Club Speedway. Mike Joy, Clint Bowyer and three-time Auto Club winner Matt Kenseth called the race in the booth for Fox. Jamie Little and Regan Smith handled the pit road duties, and Larry McReynolds provided insight from the Fox Sports studio in Charlotte.

Radio
MRN had the radio call for the race, which was also simulcast on Sirius XM NASCAR Radio. Alex Hayden, Jeff Striegle, and 2018 NASCAR Cup Championship crew chief Todd Gordon called the race from the booth when the field raced their way down the front stretch. Dan Hubbard called the race from a billboard outside turn 2 when the field raced their way through turns 1 and 2, and Kurt Becker called the race from a billboard outside turn 3 when the field raced their way through turns 3 and 4. Steve Post and Jason Toy had the pit road duties for MRN.

Standings after the race

Drivers' Championship standings

Manufacturers' Championship standings

Note: Only the first 16 positions are included for the driver standings.

References

WISE Power 400
WISE Power 400
WISE Power 400
NASCAR races at Auto Club Speedway